Interactive is defined as:   
 Interactivity, acting with each other, two interactive systems  
 Interactive computing, responding to the user

Companies 
 IAC/InterActiveCorp, an Internet company 
 Interactive Systems Corporation (ISC), a defunct software company

Music 
"Interactive", song by Prince Crystal Ball (box set)
 Interactive (band), an electronic music group

See also 
 
 
 Interact (disambiguation)
 Interaction (disambiguation)